Agon may refer to:

In arts and entertainment
 Agon (game), a board game
 Agon (tokusatsu), a Japanese TV series, full name Giant Phantom Monster Agon
 Agon (ballet), a 1957 ballet by George Balanchine with music by Igor Stravinsky
 Agon (comics), a Marvel Comics character
 Agon (film), a 2012 Albanian film
 AGON, a series of episodic adventure games for Mac and PC
 Agon, one of the four elements of play identified by Roger Caillois in his book Man, Play and Games
 Agon, the world in the MMORPG Darkfall
 Agon Wastes, a region in the video game Metroid Prime 2: Echoes
 Agon (band), a Ukrainian pop-band (2016-present).

Other uses
 Agon, ancient Greek contest
 Agón, a municipality in Aragon, Spain
 Agon-Coutainville, a commune in the Manche, France
 Agon Shu,a Japanese Buddhist denomination
 Agon Limited, a sports event promoting company

See also

 
 Agonist (disambiguation)
 Antagonist (disambiguation)
 Protagonist (disambiguation)